William Taylor Copeland, MP, Alderman (1797 – 12 April 1868) was a British businessman and politician who served as Lord Mayor of London and a Member of Parliament.

Family and business 
The family traces its descent back to John of Copeland also referred to as John de Coupland, who in 1346 captured the King of Scotland at the Battle of Neville's Cross.

Copeland was the only son of William Copeland, partner of Josiah Spode in the Stoke Potteries, of Staffordshire and of Portugal Street, London. He succeeded his father as head of the porcelain firm in Portugal Street, London and eventually bought out the interests of the Spode family in the business in the Potteries and London. He ran the business in partnership with Thomas Garrett between 1833 and 1847. After the dissolution of the  Copeland and Garret partnership, it traded as W.T. Copeland and Sons.

In 1866 Copeland was appointed china and glass manufacturer to the Prince of Wales. He became a director of the London and Birmingham Railway Company. He was also a major investor in Fenton Park Colliery.

William Taylor Copeland was a Director of the North Staffordshire Railway Company from 1846 to 1852.   He was also the first Chairman of the Provisional Directors of the Trent Valley Railway Company (TVRC), appointed on 11 April 1844 at their first meeting.  He resigned his post in February 1845, his letter of resignation being read and accepted at the TVRC Board meeting on 15 February.   His successor was Edmund Peel, brother of Sir Robert Peel.
  
In 1826 he married Sarah Yates. They had ten children, of whom a daughter and four sons survived. The sons were William Fowler Mountford Copeland (1828–1908), Edward Capper Copeland (1835–1875), Alfred James Copeland (1837–1921), and Richard Pirie Copeland (1841–1913).

His cousin, William Copeland Astbury, wrote  about William Taylor Copeland, the family, and the Copeland Spode business in his diaries, 1831–1848.

An artistic legacy

"The Hunt" collection, first introduced in 1930 as everyday earthenware, was inspired in 1830, when W.vT. Copeland, of Spode, offered the great sporting artist John Frederick Herring Sr. a house on his Essex estate. The relationship between the two men resulted in a collection of paintings. Most of the scenes used for "The Hunt" are taken from these works. The title of the featured painting is on the backside along with the official royal insignia of Spode, encapsulating its English heritage. More than two centuries of tableware tradition and the sporting life are represented in each piece.

J. F. Herring, born in 1795, undertook commissions to paint horses for titled owners. In about 1830 he was in debt and W.T. Copeland took up the bills and offered the artist a house on his estate in Essex. He also commissioned Herring to paint his own racehorses, pictures of fox hunting and scenes of rural life incorporating horses. It is from these paintings that most of the scenes for "The Hunt" are derived, although some were derived from the work of other sporting artists.

Public life 
Copeland was active in the civic life of the City of London. He was elected alderman for Bishopsgate ward in 1828, served as Sheriff of London and Middlesex in 1828–29 and in 1835 was elected Lord Mayor of London (the third youngest man to hold that office) for 1835–36.

He was a member of the Goldsmiths' Company and its master in 1837–38. For seven years he was president of the royal hospitals of Bridewell and Bethlem, as well as a member of the Irish Society and President of the Honourable Artillery Company. In 1834 he was the first President of Forest School.

Copeland was active in Ireland as a Whig politician. He contested the Irish UK parliament constituency of Coleraine at the 1831 and 1832 general elections. On both occasions he lost the initial poll, but was declared duly elected on petition. In the 1835 general election Copeland was re-elected MP for Coleraine, by a majority of five. He sat for the borough until 1837.

Copeland then contested the Stoke-upon-Trent constituency in England, as a Conservative candidate. He sat for that seat between 1837 and 1852 (when he was defeated) and again from 1857 until he retired in 1865.

See also 
William Henry Goss
John Frederick Herring Sr.
Spode

References

Further reading

British Parliamentary Election Results 1832-1885, compiled and edited by F W S Craig (2nd edition, Aldershot: Parliamentary Research Services, 1989)
Parliamentary Election Results in Ireland, 1801-1922, edited by B.M. Walker (Royal Irish Academy 1978)
The Parliaments of England by Henry Stooks Smith (1st edition published in three volumes 1844-50), 2nd edition edited (in one volume) by F.W.S. Craig (Political Reference Publications 1973)
Who's Who of British Members of Parliament: Volume I 1832-1885, by Michael Stenton (The Harvester Press 1976)

External links 
 
 Spode website
 Spode Society

1797 births
1868 deaths
English pottery
Conservative Party (UK) MPs for English constituencies
Members of the Parliament of the United Kingdom for County Londonderry constituencies (1801–1922)
People from Stoke-on-Trent
Staffordshire pottery
UK MPs 1831–1832
UK MPs 1832–1835
UK MPs 1835–1837
UK MPs 1837–1841
UK MPs 1841–1847
UK MPs 1847–1852
UK MPs 1857–1859
UK MPs 1859–1865
Whig (British political party) MPs for Irish constituencies
Sheriffs of the City of London
19th-century lord mayors of London
19th-century English politicians